The 2015 Asian Weightlifting Championships was held in Phuket, Thailand from September 3–12, 2015. It was the 45th men's and 26th women's championship.

Medal summary

Men

Women

Medal table 

Ranking by Big (Total result) medals 

Ranking by all medals: Big (Total result) and Small (Snatch and Clean & Jerk)

Team ranking

Men

Women

Participating nations 
162 athletes from 29 nations competed.

 (2)
 (6)
 (1)
 (15)
 (9)
 (1)
 (4)
 (8)
 (1)
 (8)
 (5)
 (10)
 (4)
 (1)
 (5)
 (2)
 (6)
 (9)
 (2)
 (1)
 (9)
 (8)
 (4)
 (2)
 (15)
 (9)
 (4)
 (6)
 (5)

References

Results
Results
Results Book

External links
 

Asian Weightlifting Championships
Asian Weightlifting Championships
Asian Weightlifting Championships
International weightlifting competitions hosted by Thailand